Western Sydney Infrastructure Plan (WSIP) is an A$4.1 billion 10-year road investment program in Western Sydney, New South Wales, jointly funded by the federal government ($3.3 billion) and the New South Wales state government. Originally introduced in April 2014 as a $3.5 billion program consisting of key road upgrade projects in Western Sydney, particularly in the south west surrounding the future Western Sydney Airport, the program scope was later expanded and funding was increased to $4.1 billion. The funding is now split among:
 The Northern Road Upgrade - $1.6 billion
 Bringelly Road upgrade - $500 million
 M12 Motorway - $1.75 billion
 Werrington Arterial Road - $50 million
 Glenbrook Intersection at Ross Street - $5.6 million
 Local Roads Package - $200 million

The plan will take place over 10 years, starting with the Bringelly Road upgrade which commenced construction in January 2015. The last to be completed will be the M12 Motorway, which is set to be completed prior to the completion of the new airport in 2026.

Projects

The Northern Road upgrade

Originally made up of four stages, the project was delivered in six stages, numbered by chronological order of construction commencement.

The stages arranged from north to south are stages 3, 5, 6, 4, 2 and 1. Some sections of Stages 4 to 6 that were critical to the delivery of the Western Sydney Airport were opened in stages from 2020.

Bringelly Road upgrade

$509 million  of the plan was used on the upgrade of the  Bringelly Road, which was delivered in two stages between Camden Valley Way at Leppington and The Northern Road at Bringelly. The upgrade works included widening of the road with a central median, and implementing a speed limit of 80 km/h along the road. A new underpass with The Northern Road was also constructed as part of The Northern Road upgrade, opened in July 2020.

The first stage between Camden Valley Way and King Street at Rossmore, commenced construction in January 2015 and opened to traffic in December 2018. The second stage between King Street and The Northern Road was completed in December 2020.

M12 Motorway

The plan includes the  M12 Motorway, which will provide direct access between the Western Sydney Airport and Sydney's motorway network at M7 motorway. The federal government has committed $1.4 billion towards the delivery of the $1.75 billion motorway. Construction commenced in August 2022 and completed in 2026 prior to the opening of the airport.

Werrington Arterial Road
The Werrington Arterial Road was the first major project of the infrastructure plan to be completed, involving the upgrade of Gipps Street between Great Western Highway and M4 Western Motorway in Werrington. Upgrade works including road widening, new entry and exit ramps to the M4, and intersection upgrades. The federal government contributed 50 per cent of the cost of the $52 million upgrade. Construction commenced in March 2015 and was completed in May 2017.

Glenbrook Intersection at Ross Street
The intersection of Great Western Highway and Ross Street at Glenbrook was upgraded and completed in October 2018. Works include new traffic lights at the intersection with pedestrian crossings, and closing access to the Great Western Highway from Hare Street (south), but maintaining access for emergency vehicles. The federal government funded $2.5 million towards the $5.6 million project.

Local Roads Package
The federal government is investing $200 million in a Local Roads Package, a competitive rounds-based program which allows Western Sydney councils to deliver improved road connections that support the infrastructure plan. , round 1 projects are complete and round 2 projects underway or complete, and project proposals for Round 3 projects are currently under assessment. Eligible councils include Liverpool, Camden, Wollondilly, Campbelltown, Penrith, Fairfield and Blacktown councils. An example of the projects was the intersection upgrade of Cumberland Highway at Hamilton Road, St Johns Road and John Street, which was completed under the Local Roads Package after Fairfield Council was granted $5.8 million over two years.

References

External links
Transport for NSW Roads and Maritime- WSIP
Federal Department of Infrastructure, Transport, Cities and Regional Development - WSIP

Transport in Sydney
Proposed transport infrastructure in Australia
Western Sydney